"Le Petit Tourette" (meaning "The Little Tourette") is the eighth episode of the eleventh season of the animated television series South Park, and the 161st episode overall. It first aired on Comedy Central in the United States on October 3, 2007. This episode marked the beginning of the second half of the eleventh season. In the episode, Cartman pretends to have Tourette syndrome (TS) so that he can say whatever he wants without getting into trouble. It eventually leads to trouble and he ends up saying things that he would never say. The episode's title is a play on the title of Jean-Luc Godard's 1963 film Le Petit Soldat.

The episode was written by series co-creator Trey Parker and was rated TV-MA LV in the United States, due to language and violence. It was one of the first episodes of South Park to use any of the L, S, or V sub-ratings. Parker and Stone had many discussions with Comedy Central as how to portray the language used in the episode. Eventually, the network allowed them to use nearly all curse words except for "fuck", which remained bleeped. Prior to its premiere, the episode attracted attention from the Tourette Syndrome Association (TSA, renamed in 2015 to the Tourette Association of America), who "fully expect[ed] it to be offensive and insensitive to people with TS".

The episode received mixed reviews from television critics, with some praising the episode's humor and others considering its structure disjointed. The TSA conceded that "the episode was surprisingly well-researched. The highly exaggerated emphasis on coprolalia notwithstanding, for the attentive viewer, there was a surprising amount of accurate information conveyed", adding that several elements of the episode "served as a clever device" for providing accurate facts to the public. "Le Petit Tourette" was released on DVD along with the rest of the eleventh season on August 12, 2008.

Plot
While shopping in a toy store, Cartman sees a boy named Thomas who continuously shouts obscenities, as his mother and other shoppers try to explain  to Cartman that he has Tourette syndrome (TS). Cartman decides to pretend he has the disorder as well so he can get away with shouting obscenities himself, and successfully convinces his mother and a doctor, who diagnoses him with TS and notifies the school. Kyle quickly deduces that Cartman is faking; Cartman admits the truth to him but continues to enjoy the deception. When Kyle complains to Principal Victoria, a visiting representative from a TS foundation misinterprets his statement as an allegation that all people with TS are faking. Kyle is sent to a meeting of a local support group for children with the disorder, who explain that they truly cannot control their various tics and outbursts. Realizing that Cartman has manipulated everyone else around him into believing the scam, and seeing no way to disprove it, Kyle reluctantly apologizes to the group and to Cartman. However, Cartman takes advantage of the situation to scream vulgar anti-Semitic remarks at Kyle's parents. Thomas soon realizes that Cartman is faking the disorder when he says to Thomas, "Isn't having Tourettes awesome?".

Cartman decides to appear on Dateline NBC and be interviewed by Chris Hansen, with the intention of making an anti-Semitic hate speech while being commended for his bravery in living with TS. However, at a congratulatory dinner beforehand, he inadvertently blurts out embarrassing true details from his past. Realizing that he has lost the ability to censor himself after saying whatever comes to his mind for so long, he tries to cancel the Dateline interview for fear of humiliating himself, but Hansen intimidates him into going ahead with it by telling him about a pedophile who tried to back out of appearing on the series To Catch a Predator. He shot himself after the production crew tracked him down; Hansen insinuates that the man was actually murdered and that the same will happen to Cartman if he backs out. Realizing that he has no way to avoid going on Dateline, Cartman prays for a miracle while at the same time blaming God for his predicament.

Meanwhile, Kyle teams up with Thomas, who is worried that Cartman's appearance on the show will make others think TS is fun and copy him. Not knowing that Cartman has already given up on his plan, the two boys use the Internet to solicit multiple pedophiles to visit the television studio. The pedophiles all shoot themselves upon entering the studio and seeing Hansen on stage, causing the audience to panic and flee. Outside, Craig offers to hang out with Thomas and do his laundry. As Kyle gloats to Cartman over foiling his plan, Cartman tearfully thanks him for preventing him from having to humiliate himself on live television. Kyle realizes that he has lost a chance to see Cartman brought low and exclaims "Ah, shit!" at the same time with Thomas.

Production

"Le Petit Tourette" was the mid-season premiere of South Park eleventh season, and the first episode of their fall run, which consisted of seven episodes. It was not designed as the season premiere, but rather as a "bank" episode, produced mostly prior to the run to allow the team a few days off later on in it.

Parker and Stone felt the episode with typical censorship bleeps would be unfunny, as the entire goal of the episode is that Cartman can say anything he wants without consequence. They had many discussions with Comedy Central about the show's content; one suggestion put forward was to air it at midnight, as a special episode. The calls came down to negotiating which curse words they could use and with what frequency; despite this, "fuck" would still remained bleeped in the final episode. Stone remarked that had it not been censored, it would have made advertisers unhappy. Parker noted that occasionally, when producing episodes such as this, Comedy Central would view early animatics and get nervous about the content. Executive producer Anne Garefino advised executives to wait and see its fully animated form, after which they easily approve it, due to the simplistic animation style. "As soon as you see it done by shitty cutouts, it makes it all just silly", Parker said.

The song that Cartman is singing after he finds out that Tourette's exists is inspired by "(I've Got A) Golden Ticket" from Willy Wonka & the Chocolate Factory.

The episode also features a parody of Chris Hansen, the host of To Catch a Predator. Shortly before the episode was produced, a man featured on the program committed suicide by gunshot, leading to a press frenzy. Parker and Stone noted that while they liked the program, they felt with its growing popularity the show's creators were increasingly overstepping their boundaries to catch predators. "We like To Catch a Predator, [but] we like the Constitution more", Stone said.

Reception

Critical response
The television weblog TV Squad was extremely positive, calling the episode "the stuff of brilliance". IGN gave the episode a rating of 7.5/10, asserting "this isn't the greatest episode, and not the greatest way to bring back the series—but it's got some great laughs and manages to push its single joke further than expected." 411mania took the middle ground, giving the show a 6.5/10 rating, calling it "hit and miss", and contesting that "while the first half of the show suffered because of a one-note joke, the second half showed why this series remains one of the best on television." On the negative side, BuddyTV called the episode a "misfire", criticizing it as "disjointed and a little off-putting."

Response from the Tourette Syndrome Association
Prior to the airing, the Tourette Syndrome Association (TSA) issued a press release saying they had requested that Comedy Central air their public service announcements during or after the show and that they "fully expect[ed] it to be offensive and insensitive to people with TS". The President of the TSA said, "we are actually surprised it took the creators so long to use TS as comedy fodder in this program, since no disability, illness or controversial topic is off limits to them." Following the episode, they issued a second press release, expressing concern that the episode perpetuated the misconception that most people with TS have coprolalia (involuntary swearing) when in fact 85–90% of people with TS do not. They conceded that "the episode was surprisingly well-researched. The highly exaggerated emphasis on coprolalia notwithstanding, for the attentive viewer, there was a surprising amount of accurate information conveyed", adding that several elements of the episode "served as a clever device" for providing accurate facts to the public.

References

External links
 "Le Petit Tourette" Full episode at South Park Studios
 

South Park (season 11) episodes
Television episodes about suicide
Works about Tourette syndrome